Michał Koterski, also known as Misiek Koterski (born December 29, 1979 in Kraków) is a Polish actor, TV presenter and stand-up comedian. Son of director Marek Koterski and Iwona Ciesielska.

Biography 
He is known for the roles in the films of his father, in which he played Sylwuś, son of Adam Miauczyński  Dzień świra (Day of the Wacko). The hallmark of the actor is his style of playing (which consists of the actors characteristic feminine personality)– artist calls it simply  "being himself on a daily basis". He participated in the production of the morning radio show Antyradio, where he was reading blogs of prominent politicians inter alia Renata Beger and Wojciech Wierzejski.

He is a cousin with Maciej Koterski who is playing character of Piotruś Wolański in the films Kogel-mogel and Galimatias, czyli kogel-mogel II.

He appeared in third season of the show Jak oni śpiewają (How They Sing). On April 12, 2008  he has been eliminated from the show in favour of Aneta Zając and Grażyna Szapołowska. He finished with the ninth place.

Selected filmography 
 1999: Ajlawju as Sylwuś Miauczyński 
 2002: Superprodukcja as a gas station worker
 2002: Dzień świra (Day of the Wacko) as Sylwuś Miauczyński
 2006: Królowie śródmieścia as Słoniu
 2006: Wszyscy jesteśmy Chrystusami (We're All Christs) as Sylwuś Miauczyński
 2007: 7 Dwarves: The Forest Is Not Enough as Pinocchio ( Polish language dub voice)
 2009–present: Pierwsza miłość (First Love) as Henryk "Kaśka" Saniewski
 2010: Jeż Jerzy (George the Hedgehog) as Zenek (voice)
 2011: Kac Wawa as customer of the  brothel
 2021: Gierek as Edward Gierek

References

External links 

Michał Koterski at IMDb

1979 births
Male actors from Kraków
Living people
Polish male film actors